Linus Thörnblad (born 6 March 1985) is a Swedish former track and field athlete competing in high jump. He won the bronze medal at the 2006 IAAF World Indoor Championships and a silver medal at the 2007 European Athletics Indoor Championships. He represented Sweden at the Summer Olympics in 2004 and 2008 and finished fourth at the 2010 European Athletics Championships. He has a personal best of 2.38 metres set indoors.

Biography
Thörnblad started high jumping at age 16 jumping 2.06 m his first year. Two years later he jumped 2.30 m. He decided to retire from competition in 2012 at the age of 27 due to trouble with injuries and clinical depression. In August 2018, he briefly returned to the track and won the high jump competition at the Swedish Athletics Championships, after which he returned to retirement.

Achievements

References

External links
 Personal website 
 

1985 births
Living people
Swedish male high jumpers
Athletes (track and field) at the 2004 Summer Olympics
Athletes (track and field) at the 2008 Summer Olympics
Olympic athletes of Sweden
Sportspeople from Lund